Koningsplein ('King's Square') is a square in Amsterdam. It is located between the Singel and Herengracht canals. It has become a meeting place for the local community

References

External links

TERENA Webcam Koningsplein, Amsterdam, via TERENA

Squares in Amsterdam